Titusville is a rural Canadian community in Kings County, New Brunswick.

The village centre is located at the intersection of New Brunswick Route 860 and Titusville Road.  Titusville Road connects with New Brunswick Route 820.

Notable People:
Cecil Floyd, 
Barbara Floyd

See also
List of communities in New Brunswick

References

Communities in Kings County, New Brunswick